Andy Good Peak is located on the Canadian provincial boundary between Alberta and British Columbia on the Continental Divide. It was named in 1916 after Andy Good, a hotel owner in nearby Crowsnest Pass whose bar straddled the provincial border.

See also
List of peaks on the British Columbia–Alberta border
Mountains of British Columbia

Gallery

References

Two-thousanders of Alberta
Two-thousanders of British Columbia
Canadian Rockies
Kootenay Land District